Moshe Katsav (born 5 December 1945) is an Israeli former politician who was the eighth President of Israel from 2000 to 2007. He was also a leading Likud member of the Israeli Knesset and a minister in its cabinet. He was the second Mizrahi Jew to be elected to presidency, after Yitzhak Navon.

The end of his presidency was marked by controversy, stemming from allegations of rape of one female subordinate and sexual harassment of others. Katsav resigned the presidency in 2007 as part of a plea bargain. Katsav later rejected the deal with prosecutors and vowed he would prove his innocence in court. In an unprecedented case, on 30 December 2010, Katsav was convicted of two counts of rape, obstruction of justice, and other charges. On 22 March 2011, in a landmark ruling, Katsav was sentenced to seven years in prison. Katsav appealed his conviction to the Supreme Court of Israel. On 10 November 2011, the Supreme Court affirmed Katsav's conviction and punishment.

On 7 December 2011, Katsav arrived at Maasiyahu Prison in Ramla to begin serving his seven-year sentence. He was released from prison, under restrictive conditions, on 21 December 2016, having served five years of his sentence.

Early life
Katsav was born Musa Qassab in Yazd, Iran, to Persian Jewish parents, Shmuel and Gohar Qassab. His family moved to Tehran when he was a baby, and they emigrated to Israel in 1951. They lived in a tent camp for recent immigrants for several years before the area was developed into the city of Kiryat Malakhi.

After finishing high school, Katsav was drafted into the Israel Defense Forces in 1964, serving in the C4I Corps. He then studied at the Hebrew University of Jerusalem and graduated with a Bachelor of Arts in economics and history in 1971. He married Gila Katsav in 1969. They have five children and two grandchildren.

Political career

Katsav joined the Likud Party, and was elected mayor of his home town of Kiryat Malakhi in 1969. He was elected to the Knesset in 1977.

Cabinet minister
Katsav was deputy Minister of Construction and Housing  from 1981 to 1983 and Minister of Labor and Welfare from 1984 to 1988. He was Transportation Minister from 1988 to 1992 and Deputy Prime Minister and Minister of Tourism from 1996 to 1999.

Katsav was an unsuccessful candidate in the 1993 Likud leadership election.

The public positions filled by Katsav include the following: Chairman of the Iranian Immigrants Organization; Chairman of the commission to determine higher education tuition; and Member of Ben-Gurion University Board of Trustees.

Presidency

After serving as Deputy Prime Minister in Netanyahu's government, Katsav vied for the position of President, running as the opposition candidate against Shimon Peres. In a surprising upset, he defeated Peres to become the president of Israel, being elected by the Knesset on 31 July 2000. He took 63 votes (over 57 for Peres), two more than the required majority of 61, and was sworn in on 1 August. He was the first President of Israel to have been sworn in for a seven-year term, as well as the first Likud member to win the office.  Katsav's victory was attributed in part to evidence that Peres planned to use the position to support the increasingly unpopular peace processes of the government of Ehud Barak.

The office of the Israeli President is largely ceremonial, with no executive powers save pardoning prisoners and commuting sentences. Nevertheless, each president emphasizes different aspects of the role during his tenure. In 2003, on a visit to Italy, he demanded that the Vatican restore treasures allegedly brought to Rome after the fall of Jerusalem in 70 AD.

On 8 April 2005, the alphabetic ordering of leaders during the funeral of Pope John Paul II resulted in Katsav sitting near Iranian President Mohammad Khatami who, like Katsav, was born in the Iranian province of Yazd. Katsav told the press that he shook Khatami's hand and spoke to him in Persian. Khatami later denied this.

Rape and sexual harassment case
In July 2006, Katsav complained to the Attorney General of Israel, Menachem Mazuz, that he was being blackmailed by a female employee. The investigation quickly turned against Katsav as the employee, referred to as A. (later identified as Orly Revivo), alleged sexual offences. A, who worked with Katsav when he was Minister of Tourism, claimed that Katsav raped her twice and sexually harassed her in various other ways. Katsav was accused of raping and sexually harassing up to ten women. Police raided his house and seized computers and documents on 22 August. There were calls for him to resign or suspend himself from the presidency. Katsav was questioned under caution on 23 August.

On 7 September, receiving complaints from at least four different women (according to IBA's correspondent for police affairs), the Israel Police determined that they had enough evidence for an indictment. Katsav did not attend the ceremony swearing-in Dorit Beinisch as President of the Israeli Supreme Court. On 13 September, the Knesset House Committee approved Katsav's request for leave of absence. The ceremony, normally held at the president's house, was moved to the Knesset.

Police said that seven women had testified against Katsav and the allegations included "breach of trust, fraud, and involvement in illegal wiretapping." On 18 September, Attorney-General Mazuz stated that the likelihood of Katsav being the victim of a plot was "fairly slim." By 21 September, the number of complaints rose to eight.

On 15 October 2006, police said the complaints of five of the women would not be pursued because the statute of limitations had run out. On 29 October, Attorney-General Menachem Mazuz advised Katsav to step down. While continuing to deny the allegations, he said he would resign if indicted.

Suspension and resignation
On 23 January 2007, Attorney-General Mazuz announced that he would consider charging Katsav with rape, sexual harassment, breach of trust, obstruction of justice, harassment of a witness and fraud. The president is immune from prosecution while in office, and could only be tried after the end of his term in August 2007 or after his resignation. The final decision on indictment would be made after a hearing where Katsav could present his case.

On 24 January 2007, Katsav held a press conference at which he accused journalists of persecuting him and judging him before all the evidence was in. He claimed that the media were hostile to his presidency from the start. He accused Channel 2 of conducting a witch-hunt. Katsav declared his intention to suspend himself temporarily but refused to step down unless indicted. The speech drew shock and condemnation, from journalists, politicians, and legal figures. In a talk scheduled minutes after Katsav's speech, Prime Minister Ehud Olmert called on him to resign from the presidency.

Katsav took a three-month leave of absence approved by the Knesset on 25 January. Knesset Speaker Dalia Itzik assumed the office of president in the interim in a "caretaker" capacity.

On 7 March 2007, an attempt to impeach Katsav failed. In accordance with a plea bargain, Katsav resigned effective on 1 July 2007 (his seven-year term was scheduled to run out constitutionally on 15 July 2007).

In March 2009, Katsav's brother Lior said the decision to indict Katsav was tantamount to a  "blood libel".

Plea bargaining and indictment
On 28 June 2007, Katsav's lawyers reached a plea bargain in which Katsav would plead guilty to several counts of sexual harassment and indecent acts and receive a suspended jail sentence. He would pay compensation to two of the victims. The rape charges brought by A. would be dropped, as well as Katsav's charges of blackmail. This led to a public outcry, in particular from women's rights organizations. Opinion polls showed that 70 percent of the public objected to the deal. A protest at Rabin Square in Tel Aviv drew a large crowd. The Attorney-General claimed the agreement would spare humiliation of the presidency. Katsav's attorneys said they accepted to avoid an arduous trial.

On 30 October 2007, the state prosecution told the High Court of Justice that it had changed its mind about the indictment on the basis of evidence from the two key complainants. The prosecution cited a meeting with Katsav's attorneys that highlighted contradictions in their testimony, including an affectionate letter from one of the complainants after the two rapes allegedly occurred.  The move garnered harsh criticism from the complainants' attorneys. Katsav called off the plea bargain in April 2008. According to one of his lawyers, Avigdor Feldman, he believed the prosecution did not have enough evidence to convict him.

Trial 
In March 2009, Katsav was formally indicted for rape and other sexual offenses in the Tel Aviv District Court. His trial took place between August 2009 and June 2010 before a panel of three judges, consisting of Presiding Judge George Karra and Justices Miriam Sokolov and Yehudit Shevach. Katsav's testimony began in January 2010. The prosecutors were Ronit Amiel and Nissim Merom, of the State Prosecutor's Office Central District Office. Katsav's defense team consisted of attorneys Zion Amir, Avigdor Feldman, and Avraham Lavi. The trial was held behind closed doors (as is customary in trials of sexual offenses) and a media ban was imposed on the details of the trial, witnesses and testimony. The ban was lifted in August 2010, when protocols of the trial were released.

In the absence of forensic evidence, prosecutors built their case almost entirely on witness testimony. According to legal experts, the similarities in the testimonies of the victims, who could not have known one another, would be instrumental in his conviction.

Conviction 
On 30 December 2010, the three judges unanimously found Katsav guilty of "rape, sexual harassment, committing an indecent act while using force, harassing a witness and obstruction of justice". Presiding Judge Karra read the verdict which stated that Katsav "engaged in a campaign of vilification against the plaintiffs." Katsav faced a maximum sentence of 49 years. Prime Minister Benjamin Netanyahu said that it was "a sad day for Israel", but that the verdict shows that in Israel "all are equal before the law, and that every woman has exclusive rights to her body." The conviction was described as "landmark" and "unprecedented", and the story featured prominently in the international media. The sentencing phase began on 22 February 2011.

On 22 March 2011, Moshe Katsav was sentenced to seven years in prison and two years' probation for rape, indecent acts, sexual harassment and obstruction of justice, becoming the first former President of Israel to be sentenced to prison. In addition, he was ordered to pay one of the women compensation totaling 100,000 NIS and another a sum of 25,000 NIS. Katsav's lawyer Zion Amir told reporters that the sentence would be appealed to the Supreme Court of Israel.

In July 2011, it was cleared for publication that Katsav was under police investigation on suspicion of using private investigators to harass witnesses and a complainant. Police suspected that the investigators were trying to obtain new evidence to undermine their credibility. It was thought that Katsav hired the investigators after he was found guilty and before the Supreme Court appeal was filed. Katsav, his brothers Lior and Yoram, and his son Noam were questioned for an hour by National Fraud Investigations Unit officers on suspicion of witness harassment, tampering and invasion of privacy.

In May 2011, Supreme Court Justice Yoram Danziger granted Katsav's motion to delay his entrance to prison until the Supreme Court heard his appeal. Deliberations on the appeal began on 7 August 2011, and were conducted by a three-judge panel consisting of Justices Edna Arbel, Miriam Naor, and Salim Joubran. Katsav's attorney suggested that his client actually was sexually involved with one of the alleged victims, but that no rape occurred. He also suggested that the plaintiffs' testimonies were filled with contradictions. When deliberations resumed on 10 August, Katsav's attorney suggested that his client's actions did not constitute anything beyond "an ordinary hug". Deliberations on the appeal adjourned on 11 August. The court delivered its opinion on 10 November, unanimously upholding Katsav's conviction and sentence. The three-judge panel stated that they refrained from assessing the truth of the statements made by the accusers and otherwise rejected possibly exculpatory evidence. Justice Salim Joubran stated that Katsav "fell from the loftiest heights to the deepest depths. Such a senior official should be a role model to his subordinates. Every woman has a right to her own body. A right to dignity. A right to freedom. No one has the liberty to take any of those from her". Katsav was given until 7 December to put his affairs in order.

Prison 

Following the decision, Katsav's family turned to a number of politicians, asking that Katsav's home, already surrounded by stone walls put up by Shin Bet's Protective Security Department, be declared a "temporary prison", and that he be allowed to serve his sentence there. In a letter to Public Security Minister Yitzhak Aharonovich, Katsav's brother Lior wrote that while in prison, his brother could be exposed to convicts whose presidential pardon requests he had rejected, and claimed that he had knowledge of state secrets that could be compromised in prison. Aharonovich rejected that request, with sources close to him stating that prisoners were only permitted to serve their sentences at home in extremely rare cases.

Katsav arrived at Maasiyahu Prison in Ramla at 10:08 a.m. on 7 December 2011 to begin serving his sentence. Before departing for prison, he addressed journalists outside his home and maintained his innocence. Dozens of police officers were deployed to the prison to maintain order, and there was a large domestic and foreign media presence. Prison authorities determined that Katsav did not pose a suicide risk, and it was decided that the cameras in his cell would only be activated when his cellmate was absent.

Katsav was Israel Prison Service inmate #1418989. His cell was located in the prison's Torani cellblock, a special block for religious prisoners. Though considered less harsh than other blocs, inmates in the Torani bloc have no access to television or newspapers. Prisoners are woken at 4:30 a.m. for morning prayers, pray three times a day, and spend most of the day in two seminaries studying Torah and other sacred Jewish texts. Shlomo Benizri, another former politician who was in prison for corruption, was Katsav's cellmate until his 2012 release. During his sentence, Katsav was bullied and harassed by convicted mass murderer Ami Popper, who Katsav had refused to pardon during his term in office. Popper's behavior resulted in his being transferred to another prison.

It was announced on 15 October 2012, that Israel's President Shimon Peres received a formal request to pardon Katsav. The request came from Katsav's wife, Gila.

The prison parole board rejected a request by Moshe Katsav for a conditional early release from prison on 6 April 2016. It is allowed by Israeli law to release a prisoner after serving two thirds of a term. The parole board decided that Katsav, who always maintained he is innocent and never expressed any regret for his actions and also refused to take part in rehabilitation programs, could continue to harass the victims and still posed a risk to women.

Release

On 18 December 2016, the parole board granted Katsav early release, announcing that he had expressed regret for his actions before it, even though he had failed to do so publicly. The parole board delayed his release for a week to allow prosecutors to consider whether to appeal. On 21 December 2016, Katsav was released from prison after the State Attorney decided not to appeal the Parole Board's decision for early release.

Katsav served a total of 5 years and 15 days of his 7-year sentence. The Prisoner Rehabilitation Authority imposed parole restrictions to be followed for the remainder of his 7-year sentence. Under the terms of his parole, he was prohibited from making any statements to the media or leaving the country. He was required to attend rehabilitation and visit a psychologist once a week, attend daily Torah study sessions, and remain at his home under a curfew from 10 PM to 6 AM. He was also forbidden from discussing or defaming his victims or holding any position where women are his subordinates.

In August 2017, President Reuven Rivlin rejected an appeal from Katsav to cancel the conditions of his parole. A parole board rejected a request to lift his nighttime curfew in November 2017. In April 2018, the Lod District Court rejected an appeal to cancel his nighttime curfew.

See also 
 Iranian Jews in Israel
 Yazd
Shaul Mofaz
 List of Israeli public officials convicted of crimes or misdemeanors
 Iran-Israel relations

References

External links

BBC Profile

1945 births
Living people
21st-century criminals
Deputy ministers of Israel
Heads of government who were later imprisoned
Hebrew University of Jerusalem alumni
Iranian emigrants to Israel
Iranian Jews
Israeli government officials convicted of crimes
Israeli Mizrahi Jews
Israeli people convicted of rape
Israeli people of Iranian-Jewish descent
Israeli politicians convicted of crimes
Israeli politicians of Iranian descent
Israeli prisoners and detainees
Jewish Israeli politicians
Likud politicians
Mayors of places in Israel
Members of the 9th Knesset (1977–1981)
Members of the 10th Knesset (1981–1984)
Members of the 11th Knesset (1984–1988)
Members of the 12th Knesset (1988–1992)
Members of the 13th Knesset (1992–1996)
Members of the 14th Knesset (1996–1999)
Members of the 15th Knesset (1999–2003)
Ministers of Tourism of Israel
Ministers of Transport of Israel
People convicted of obstruction of justice
People from Kiryat Malakhi
People from Yazd
Politicians convicted of sex offences
Presidents of Israel
Prisoners and detainees of Israel
Recipients of the Order of the Golden Fleece (Georgia)